Richard Spiegelburg (born 12 August 1977 in Georgsmarienhütte, Lower Saxony) is a German pole vaulter. He is the older brother of Silke Spiegelburg.

Biography
He won the 1999 Summer Universiade and finished fourth at the 2000 European Indoor Athletics Championships. He then finished sixth at the 2001 World Championships in Edmonton and eighth at the 2002 European Indoor Athletics Championships in Vienna.

After failing to progress from the qualifying round at the 2002 European Championships he fell out of the international spotlight for some years, but returned in 2005 with a fourth place at the Universiade. In 2006 he finished thirteenth at the 2006 European Championships in Gothenburg.

His personal best jump is 5.85 metres, achieved in June 2001 in Stuttgart. This ranks him eighth among German pole vaulters.

Competition record

See also
 Germany all-time top lists - Pole vault

References

External links

1977 births
Living people
People from Georgsmarienhütte
Sportspeople from Lower Saxony
German male pole vaulters
Universiade medalists in athletics (track and field)
Universiade gold medalists for Germany
Medalists at the 1999 Summer Universiade